Baek Sang Seung (December 12, 1935 – September 23, 2018) was a South Korean politician who served as the mayor of Gyeongju.  He was elected to the post in 2002.  He was a member of the Grand National Party.  He studied public administration at the undergraduate level at Korea University, and attended graduate school in the same field at Seoul National University.  Prior to attaining his present position, he held various positions in the Seoul municipal government.

See also
List of Koreans
Politics of South Korea

References

External links
Korean-language resume

Seoul National University alumni
People from North Gyeongsang Province
People from Gyeongju
1935 births
2018 deaths
Mayors of places in South Korea
Liberty Korea Party politicians